Starquake may refer to:

 Starquake (astrophysics), a phenomenon when the crust of a neutron star undergoes a sudden adjustment
 Starquake (novel), a 1989 novel by Robert L. Forward
 Starquake (video game), a 1985 computer game

See also
 Asteroseismology, the study of oscillations in stars